Gillian Katherine d'Hondt (born 16 April 1982) is an American and European women's basketball player originally from Seattle, Washington.

Early life and college
D'Hondt attended Bishop Blanchet High School in Seattle, Washington, and accepted a basketball scholarship to the University of the Pacific in Stockton, California. While at the University of the Pacific, she earned all Big West Conference second team honors from 2002–2004. In 2004, she received recognition on the first team all-Big West Conference women's basketball tournament team.  Throughout her four-year career at the University of the Pacific, she averaged 14.3 points per game and 6.7 rebounds per game.

Pacific statistics

Source

Professional career
D'Hondt competed in the 2006 Commonwealth Games in Melbourne on the England women's national basketball team. d'Hondt played for multiple European teams, including the Rhondda Rebels and Isolux Corsan Guadalajara. She qualified for the 2006 England Women's Basketball National Team, and won a bronze medal at the 2006 Commonwealth Games in Melbourne, Australia. It was an historic event being the first time the men's and women's teams were competing as England in a major multi-sport event and it was the first Commonwealth Games in which basketball was featured.  Gillian has also played for Guadalajara, Spain; Saarlouis, Germany; ADBA Avilés, Spain; Barking Abbey, United Kingdom; Waregem, Belgium; and most recently Ancona, Italy.

Coaching career
In 2014, d'Hondt accepted a coaching position at Northwest University in Kirkland, Washington, as a women's basketball assistant coach. In May 2015, d'Hondt took over as the head coach for the Mercer Island High School girls basketball team. She led the Mercer Island team to a state championship in the 2016–17 season.

Personal life
D'Hondt is the daughter of Canadian Olympic gold medalist for rowing, Walter D'Hondt.

References

External links
 
 
 
 
 
 

1982 births
Living people
Basketball players at the 2006 Commonwealth Games
Bishop Blanchet High School alumni
Centers (basketball)
Canadian women's basketball coaches
Canadian women's basketball players
Commonwealth Games bronze medallists for England
Commonwealth Games medallists in basketball
English women's basketball players
Pacific Tigers women's basketball players
Basketball players from Seattle
Medallists at the 2006 Commonwealth Games